Steeve Selso Saint-Duc (born 8 January 2000), commonly known as Selso, is a Haitian footballer.

Club career
Los Angeles FC declined a contract option for Saint-Duc. Saint-Duc made his professional debut on 30 March 2019 for Lansing Ignite against the Richmond Kickers in the USL League One.

Honours

International
Haiti U17
CFU Men's U-17 Tournament: 2016

Individual
CFU Men's U-17 Tournament Golden Ball: 2016
CFU Men's U-17 Tournament Golden Boot: 2016
CFU Men's U-17 Tournament Best XI: 2016

References

External links

 
 
 

2000 births
Living people
Haitian footballers
Haitian expatriate footballers
Haitian expatriate sportspeople in Norway
Haitian expatriate sportspeople in the United States
Association football forwards
Expatriate footballers in Norway
Expatriate soccer players in the United States
AEP Kozani F.C. players
Lansing Ignite FC players
Los Angeles FC players
People from Les Cayes
Strømmen IF players
USL League One players
Haiti under-20 international footballers
Haiti youth international footballers